Noor Al-Sham, also spelled Nour El-Sham (Arabic , literal translation "The Light of the Levant" is a state-run, religious satellite television station based in Damascus, Syria since 31 July 2011.

The channel intends "to convey a broad and genuine understanding of Islam and its legal rules", according to SANA.

References

External links
Nour el-Sham TV official website 
Nour el-Sham TV live stream 
 
 
 

2011 establishments in Syria
Arabic-language television stations
Television channels in Syria
Television channels and stations established in 2011
Islamic television networks
Mass media in Damascus